Herber Antonio Barrera Romero (born April 28, 1987) is a Salvadoran footballer.

Club career
Barrera started his career at third division side Topiltzín, with whom he clinched promotion to the Second division in 2005. In 2007, he stepped back to the third division and joined Espíritu Santo and made his debut in the Primera División de Fútbol de El Salvador with Luís Ángel Firpo in 2008. In summer 2010 he was out of contract with Firpo, with Atletico Balboa and Atletico Marte interested, but Barrera rejected Balboa and Marte did not have the money to sign him.

International career
Barrera made his debut for El Salvador in a July 2009 CONCACAF Gold Cup match against Canada, coming on as a late substitute for Williams Reyes. As of January 2011, this has been his only international match.

References

External links

1987 births
Living people
People from Usulután Department
Association football forwards
Salvadoran footballers
El Salvador international footballers
2009 CONCACAF Gold Cup players
C.D. Luis Ángel Firpo footballers